The Pégase class was a class of 74-gun ships of the French Navy, built to a common design by naval constructor Antoine Groignard. It comprised six ships, all ordered during  1781 and all named on 13 July 1781.

The name-ship of the class - Pégase - was captured by the British Navy just two months after her completion; the other five ships were all at Toulon in August 1793 when that port was handed over by French Royalists to the occupying Anglo-Spanish forces, and they were seized by the British Navy. When French Republican forces forced the evacuation of the Allies in December, the Puissant was sailed to England (and - like the Pégase - was used as a harbour hulk there until the end of the Napoleonic Wars), and the Liberté (ex-Dictateur) and Suffisant were destroyed during the evacuation of the port; the remaining pair were recovered by the French Navy - see their respective individual histories below.

Ships 
Pégase
Builder: Brest Dockyard
Ordered: June 1781
Begun: June 1781
Launched: 5 October 1781
Completed: February 1782
Fate: Captured by HMS Foudroyant in the Bay of Biscay on 21 April 1782 (with 80 men of her crew killed); renamed HMS Pegase; hulked 1794 at Plymouth, until broken up in 1815.

Puissant 
Builder: Lorient Dockyard
Ordered: 13 July 1781
Begun: August 1781
Launched: 13 March 1782
Completed: June 1782
Fate: Surrendered to the British by her Royalist crew during the Siege of Toulon on 29 August 1793; removed to England at the evacuation of the city; became a hulk in Portsmouth 1796; broken up in 1816.

Dictateur 
Builder: Toulon Dockyard
Ordered: 13 July 1781
Begun: July 1781
Launched: 16 February 1782
Completed: August 1782
Fate: Renamed Liberté on 29 September 1792. Burnt at the end of the Siege of Toulon on 18 December 1793. Raised in 1805 and scrapped in 1808.

Suffisant 
Builder: Toulon Dockyard
Ordered: 13 July 1781
Begun: July 1781
Launched: 6 March 1782
Completed: August 1782
Fate: Burnt at the end of the Siege of Toulon 18 December 1793. Raised in 1805 and scrapped in 1806.

Alcide 
Builder: Rochefort Dockyard
Ordered: 13 July 1781
Begun: July 1781
Launched: 25 May 1782
Completed: January 1783
Fate: Burnt during the Battle of Hyères Islands on 18 July 1795 by her own heated shots, and exploded.

Censeur 
Builder: Rochefort Dockyard
Ordered: 13 July 1781
Begun: August 1781
Launched: 24 July 1782
Completed: October 1783
Fate: Captured by the British at the Battle of Cape Noli 14 March 1795; retaken in the action of 7 October 1795 by de Richery's squadron off Cape St Vincent; sold at Cadiz to Spain in June 1799 in exchange for the Spanish San Sebastián.

Notes and references

Notes

References

Bibliography 
 
Winfield, Rif and Roberts, Stephen S. (2017) French Warships in the Age of Sail 1626–1786: Design, Construction, Careers and Fates.. Seaforth Publishing, 2017. .
Winfield, Rif and Roberts, Stephen S. (2015) French Warships in the Age of Sail 1786-1861: Design, Construction, Careers and Fates. Seaforth Publishing. .

 
Ship of the line classes from France
Ship classes of the French Navy